Tell Qarqur is a major archaeological site located in the Orontes River Valley of western Syria.  Situated in a rich alluvial plain known as the Ghab valley, the double-mounded site lies near the modern Syrian town of Jisr ash-Shugur and one kilometer west of the village of Qarqur.

History
Tell Qarqur possesses a 10,000-year history of virtually continuous occupation, from the Pre-Pottery Neolithic A (c. 8500 BC) through the Mamluk period (AD 1350).  However, the settlement reached its greatest extent during the Early Bronze Age (3000–2000 BC), and again during the Iron Age II (1000–500 BC).  The site is probably best known for its probable association with the ancient town of Qarqar, the location of a major battle that occurred in 853 BC.  The Battle of Qarqar, recorded both in Neo-Assyrian royal annals and on the Kurkh Monolith, was fought between the Neo-Assyrian army under the leadership of Shalmaneser III and a coalition of small Levantine kingdoms.  The Levantine alliance included Biblical figures such as King Hadadezer (Ben Hadad) of Damascus and King Ahab of Israel.

Archaeology
The tell has two mounds, a smaller one to the north and a larger one to the south. Tell Qarqur was first subjected to scientific excavation in 1983 and 1984 by an expedition of the American Schools of Oriental Research (ASOR) and Brigham Young University (BYU), led by John M. Lundquist of BYU. From 1993 to 2001 the site was excavated by an ASOR-sponsored expedition under the direction of Dr. Rudolph Dornemann. The excavations uncovered remains of many different phases of the site's long occupational history, but the project found especially impressive remains dating to the Early Bronze Age IV (2200–2000 BC) and the Iron Age I–II (1200–500 BC). Finds included several phases of stone-built fortification walls, numerous private houses, and a temple complex dating to the later third millennium BC. After a pause, excavations were resumed in 2005 when the University of Arkansas became a cosponsor of the project and Dr. Jesse Casana joined the expedition. Work was conducted for three seasons, in 2005, 2007 and 2008. 

Archeological team found out that Tell Qarqur not only survived "4.2 kiloyear event", a severe aridification event that brought collapse to nearby civilisations, but even expanded. Several important artifacts from the site are currently on display at the Hama Museum in Hama, Syria.

Destruction of the site 
From 2014 until September 2017, the terrorist Turkistan Islamic Party, an Alqaeda offshoot, destroyed the site. Reports emerged that the destruction, which can be viewed through satellite imagery, was done under the supervision of unidentified civilians who were not Syrian nor members of the Turkistan Islamic Party militants.

The site has suffered significant looting and damage from military activity during the Syrian Civil War.

See also
Cities of the ancient Near East

Notes

Further reading

External links
University of Arkansas article on the resumption of excavation

Populated places established in the 9th millennium BC
Populated places disestablished in the 14th century
Bronze Age sites in Syria
Former populated places in Syria
Archaeological sites in Hama Governorate
Neolithic sites in Syria
Iron Age sites in Syria
Pre-Pottery Neolithic A
de:Qarqar